Verbiest or Verbist is a Flemish surname.  Notable people with the surname include:

 Ferdinand Verbiest, Flemish Jesuit missionary in China
 Theophiel Verbist, Belgian priest who founded in 1862 the Congregation of Scheutveld
 Laurent Verbiest, Belgian soccer player

See also
 2545 Verbiest